The .429 DE is a cartridge introduced in 2018 by Magnum Research for the Desert Eagle line of handguns.

Design
The .429 DE is a .50 AE case that is necked down to accept .429-diameter (10.9mm) bullets used in the .44 Magnum. The cartridge features a 25% increase in velocity and 45% increase of energy over a standard 240-grain .44 Magnum load (1742 joules at 100 meters) . The .429 DE offers increased speed and accuracy over the .50 AE due to its lighter and slimmer projectile. Also, due to its use of the same cartridge design, one can easily convert a .50 AE Desert Eagle to .429 DE with only a barrel change. Magazines and bolts will both interchange between .50 AE and .429 DE. Though very similar to the obsolete .440 Cor-Bon, it is not interchangeable with that cartridge. The same bolt and magazines can be used as the .50 AE-chambered Desert Eagle.  In 2021, the .429 DE was accepted into SAAMI standardization.

References

Pistol and rifle cartridges
Weapons and ammunition introduced in 2018